Oliver Blume (born 6 June 1968) is a German manager and CEO of Volkswagen Group. He is also simultaneously the CEO of Porsche.

Personal life 
Blume was born in Braunschweig. After graduating from high school in Braunschweig, Blume studied mechanical engineering at the Braunschweig University of Technology.

In 1994, Blume graduated from an international trainee program at Audi.

Career 
At age 28, he was a planner for body shop and paint at Audi. Three years later, he took over the responsibility for the body of the Audi A3, and two more years after that, he was appointed Executive Assistant production at Audi. He received his PhD on vehicle technology. For five years, Blume was in the production planning of SEAT, another five years at the Volkswagen brand.

In 2013, he was appointed to the Porsche Executive Board, where he was responsible for production and logistics.

Since 1 October 2015 Blume has served as CEO of Volkswagen subsidiary Porsche; the supervisory board of the company appointed him to this position on 30 September 2015. He replaced Matthias Müller, who became CEO of VW Group.

Other activities
 Fraunhofer Society, Member of the Senate

References 

Living people
1968 births
German chief executives
Businesspeople from Braunschweig
Porsche people
Technical University of Braunschweig alumni